The 2004–05 season was the second season in the history of the Llanelli Scarlets rugby union team. They competed in the Celtic League, in which they finished in fifth place, as well as the Celtic Cup and Heineken Cup. They reached the final of the Celtic Cup, losing 27–16 to Munster at Lansdowne Road in Dublin, but won just two matches in their Heineken Cup pool, finishing third behind Toulouse and Northampton Saints.

Celtic League

Matches

Table

Celtic Cup

Heineken Cup

Pool stage
The Scarlets were drawn into Pool 3 for the 2004–05 Heineken Cup. For the second season in a row, they were paired with Northampton Saints, along with Toulouse from France and Glasgow from Scotland. They began the pool stage on 22 October with a narrow 9–6 defeat at home to Toulouse, a game they should have won thanks to two missed try-scoring opportunities. The following week they faced Northampton, whom they had beaten twice the previous season, but this time they managed just a penalty as Northampton recorded a 25–3 win.

In December, the Scarlets recorded their first wins, home and away against Glasgow. In the away leg on 5 December, the Scarlets claimed the bonus point before half-time thanks to tries from Gavin Thomas, Matthew Watkins (2) and Garan Evans, and held off a comeback by Glasgow to claim a 29–26 win. Another bonus-point victory at Stradey Park the following week, thanks to braces from Aisea Havili, Tal Selley and another try from Vernon Cooper, kept the Scarlets in with a chance of qualifying for the quarter-finals.

That chance was extinguished when European rugby resumed in January 2005, as a last-minute try from World Cup-winning England hooker Steve Thompson gave Northampton a 22–20 win. Although the Scarlets could finish second in their pool with victory over Toulouse the following week, their points total would not be enough to be one of the two best runners-up. Although the Scarlets scored five tries against Toulouse, including a double from Chris Wyatt, the French side scored eight of their own to win 53–36, confirming a third-place finish for the Scarlets.

References

2004-05
Scarlets
Scarlets
Scarlets